The 1893–94 FA Cup was the 23rd edition of the world's oldest football knockout competition, The Football Association Challenge Cup, or FA Cup.  The cup was won by Notts County of the Football League Second Division, who defeated Bolton Wanderers 4–1 in the final to win the cup for the first and, to date, only time.

Matches were scheduled to be played at the stadium of the team named first on the date specified for each round, which was always a Saturday. Some matches, however, might be rescheduled for other days if there were clashes with games for other competitions or the weather was inclement. If scores were level after 90 minutes had been played, a replay would take place at the stadium of the second-named team later the same week. If the replayed match was drawn further replays would be held until a winner was determined. If scores were level after 90 minutes had been played in a replay, a 30-minute period of extra time would be played.

Calendar

Results

First round proper

Second round proper

Third round proper

Semi-finals

Final

The 1894 FA Cup Final was a football match played on 31 March 1894. The final was contested by Notts County and Bolton Wanderers at Goodison Park, Liverpool. Notts County won 4–1 with Jimmy Logan becoming the second player to ever score a hat-trick at an FA Cup Final

Match details

References

1893-94
FA Cup
FA